This is a list of bridges and other crossings of the Youghiogheny River starting from its mouth in McKeesport, Pennsylvania upstream.

Crossings

See also

 List of crossings of the Monongahela River

References

Youghiogheny River